Moamen Mohamed (Arabic: مؤمن محمد, born July 12, 1999, in Alexandria, Egypt) is an Egyptian Karate and is a member of the Egyptian national karate team.

Education 
In June 2022, Moamen received BA degree in pharmacy from the Arab Academy for Science, Technology and Maritime Transport.

Career 
Moamen began practicing karate at the age of 4 in the Nahhas Company Club, where he won first place and his first medal in his sports career at the Alexandria Championship under the age of 9. Moamen joined the Suof Club, where he won first place in the Republic Championship for 5 consecutive years, and in 2013 he joined Smouha Club as a member of the Egyptian national karate team.

in 2017, Moamen competed at the World Karate Championships in Spain and won the silver medal, followed by a bronze medal in the 2019 World Karate Championships in Chile, and was the Egyptian team captain during the tournament.

From 2015 to 2017, he competed for the Shabab Al Ahli Club in the UAE, and won the UAE President's Cup and the UAE League. In 2019, he competed for Al Hilal SFC where he won first place in the Arab Cup Winners' Cup.

Egyptian President Abdel Fattah el-Sisi awarded Moamen the Order of the Republic in Sports for his contributions to competitive Karate in 2020.

Moamen won a Gold medal in the 2022 Series A Tournament which was held in Kocaeli Province, and a Bronze medal in Series A which was held in Cairo in the 67kg division.

International competitions

References 

1999 births
Sportspeople from Alexandria
Egyptian male karateka
Living people